My Man is a 1928 black and white part-talkie American comedy-drama musical film directed by Archie Mayo starring Fanny Brice and featuring Guinn "Big Boy" Williams. It was Brice's feature film debut at the age of 37. She was a star in the Ziegfeld Follies before she started acting in motion pictures. At the time Warner Bros. made this film there were still some silent movies in production and being released. My Man used intertitles but included talking sequences, synchronized music, and sound effects using a Vitaphone sound-on-disc system. It was not until 1929 that talking movies would completely take over, but Warner Bros. had completely stopped making silent movies and switched to sound pictures by the end of that year, either part talking or full talking. Warner Bros. also started making movies in color as well as sound movies.

Plot
Fannie Brand (Fanny Brice), an industrious girl who supports her brother and sister by working in a theatrical costume house, falls in love with Joe Halsey (Guinn "Big Boy" Williams), a young fellow who earns a precarious living demonstrating an elastic exerciser in a drugstore window. Fannie and Joe set a date to be married, but the wedding is called off when Fannie finds Joe making love to her unprincipled sister, Edna (Edna Murphy). Fannie auditions for Landau (Andrés De Segurola), a theatrical producer, and goes on the Broadway stage. Fannie is a great success, and she and Joe soon find their way back into each other's arms.

Cast
Fanny Brice as Fannie Brand (credited as Fannie Brice)
Guinn "Big Boy" Williams as Joe Halsey
Edna Murphy as Edna Brand
Andrés De Segurola as Landau
Richard Tucker as Waldo
Billy Seay as Sammy
Arthur Hoyt as Thorne
Ann Brody as Mrs. Schultz
Clarissa Selwynne as Forelady

Reception
According to Warner Bros. records, the film earned $1,099,000 in the U.S. and $119,000 elsewhere.

Songs
 "I'd Rather Be Blue Over You" – Fred Fisher and Billy Rose
 "My Man" – music by Maurice Yvain, lyrics by Channing Pollock
 "Second Hand Rose" – music by James F. Hanley, lyrics by Grant Clarke
 "If You Want the Rainbow, You Must Have the Rain" – music by Oscar Levant, lyrics by Mort Dixon and Billy Rose
 "I'm an Indian" – music by Leo Edwards, lyrics by Blanche Merrill
 "I Was a Florodora Baby" – music by Harry Carroll, lyrics by Ballard MacDonald
All songs sung by Fanny Brice.

Premiere Vitaphone short subjects
My Man premiered at the Warners' Theatre in Manhattan on December 21, 1928.

Film preservation  
An incomplete version of this film reportedly survives. In addition to this incomplete copy, the full synchronized soundtrack survives on Vitaphone discs, as well as the soundtrack for the theatrical trailer.

See also
 List of lost films
 List of early Warner Bros. talking features

References

External links

New York Times feature
My Man Soundtrack at Internet Archive
 My Man Soundtrack Trailer at SoundCloud

1928 films
Films directed by Archie Mayo
Transitional sound comedy-drama films
Lost American films
Films produced by Edward Small
American black-and-white films
Warner Bros. films
1920s musical comedy-drama films
American musical comedy-drama films
1928 lost films
Lost comedy-drama films
Lost musical films
1928 comedy films
1928 drama films
1920s American films
1920s English-language films